Aspergillus appendiculatus (also called A. testaceocolorans) is a species of fungus in the genus Aspergillus. It is from the Aspergillus section. The species was first described in 1975. It has been reported to produce asperflavin, auroglaucin, bisanthrons, dihydroauroglaucin, echinulins, emodin, erythroglaucin, flavoglaucin, isoechinulins, neoechinulins, physcion, questin, questinol, tetracyclic, and tetrahydroauroglaucin.

Growth and morphology

A. appendiculatus has been cultivated on both Czapek yeast extract agar (CYA) plates and Malt Extract Agar Oxoid® (MEAOX) plates. The growth morphology of the colonies can be seen in the pictures below.

References 

appendiculatus
Fungi described in 1975